Sarun, Iran may refer to:
 Sarand, Ferdows
 Do Hesaran